Ferdinando Martínez Valencia (born on April 15, 1982) also known as Ferdinando Valencia is a Mexican actor.

Television roles

Discography
Camaleones (band)

References

External links 
 

Living people
Male actors from Colima
Mexican male telenovela actors
Mexican male television actors
1979 births